Jalil Zandi (1951–2001) was a fighter pilot in the Islamic Republic of Iran Air Force (IRIAF) who served during all of the Iran–Iraq War. His combat record qualifies him as one of the most successful pilots of that conflict in air-to-air combat, as well as one of the best Iranian aces ever. It also made him the highest-scoring pilot in the history of the F-14 Tomcat.

Career
Jalil Zandi began in the Imperial Iranian Air Force and after the 1979 Islamic revolution stayed on to serve in the IRIAF when it was somewhat dangerous for pilots to continue their military service. While a major, he often clashed with his superior Lt. Col. Abbas Babaei. Abbas Babaei was "notorious for his merciless treatment of the pilots and officers" considered disloyal to the new regime and because of this  Jalil Zandi was condemned to  ten years of imprisonment. When he was in prison, he was threatened to be sentenced to death, but by demand of the then-air force commander and many other air force pilots, he was released after six months.

Iran–Iraq War

He earned his fame as an F-14 Tomcat pilot during the Iran–Iraq War. He has been reliably credited with shooting down 11 Iraqi aircraft (eight confirmed victories through examination with US intelligence documents released according to FOIA inquiry and three probable victories). The victories include four MiG-23s, two Su-22s, two MiG-21s, and three Mirage F1s. This makes him one of the most successful Iranian  fighter aces and the most successful F-14 Tomcat pilot worldwide.

Post-war
His last official post, before his death, was deputy for planning and organization of the Iranian Air Force.

He died with his wife Zahra Moheb Shahedin in 2001 in a car accident near Tehran. He is buried in Behesht-e Zahra cemetery in the south of Tehran. He had three sons: Vahid, Amir, and Nader.

See also
 F-14 Tomcat operational history
 Iranian aerial victories during the Iran-Iraq war
 List of aces of aces

References 

Iranian aviators
Islamic Republic of Iran Army personnel of the Iran–Iraq War
Islamic Republic of Iran Air Force personnel
2001 deaths
Iranian flying aces
Iran–Iraq War flying aces
1951 births
Road incident deaths in Iran